Marco Antonio León (born 16 December 1962) is a Colombian former professional racing cyclist. He rode in three editions of the Tour de France.

Major results
1984
 1st Stage 4 Clásico RCN

Grand Tour general classification results timeline

References

External links

1962 births
Living people
Colombian male cyclists
Place of birth missing (living people)
Sportspeople from Bogotá